Timothy "T. J." Gore (born September 7, 1987 in Macomb, Michigan) is an American soccer player.

Career

College and amateur
Gore attended De La Salle Collegiate High School in Warren, Michigan, for 2 years before transferring to Dakota High School in Macomb, a suburb of Detroit, Michigan, where he named to the All-State Team his senior season and was a finalist for Michigan's Gatorade High School Player of the Year, and played club soccer for the Vardar club, who he helped lead to the Michigan and Midwest Championships in 2005.

He played four years of college soccer at the University of Vermont, where he was hailed as one of the best forwards in the America East conference, earning a spot on the all-conference first team as a freshman in 2006. He was named to the America East All-Conference Second Team in 2007, was an all-league selection for the third straight year after being named to the America East All-Conference Second Team as a junior in 2008, and finished his collegiate career with 10 goals and 13 assists in 74 games for the Catamounts.

During his college years he also played for Michigan Bucks in the USL Premier Development League.

Professional
Gore turned professional in 2010 when he signed with the Rochester Rhinos. He made his professional debut on April 25, 2010 in a game against the Austin Aztex.

Honors

Rochester Rhinos
USSF Division 2 Pro League Regular Season Champions (1): 2010

References

External links
 Vermont bio

1987 births
Living people
People from Macomb County, Michigan
Sportspeople from Metro Detroit
Soccer players from Michigan
American soccer players
Association football forwards
Association football midfielders
Flint City Bucks players
Rochester New York FC players
USL League Two players
USSF Division 2 Professional League players
USL Championship players
Vermont Catamounts men's soccer players